Australian Survivor: Champions vs. Contenders 2, is the sixth season of Australian Survivor and the fourth season to air on Network Ten and to be hosted  by Jonathan LaPaglia, and was filmed on the Fijian community of Savusavu.

The television series is based on the international reality game show franchise Survivor. As with the previous season, the season features 24 contestants divided into two tribes: "Champions", composed of twelve high-achievers who excelled in their fields, and "Contenders", composed of twelve everyday Australians.

It premiered on Wednesday, 24 July 2019, and concluded on 17 September 2019 with Pia Miranda named the winner over Baden Gillbert in a unanimous 9–0 vote, winning the grand prize of A$500,000 and title of Sole Survivor.

Contestants
The 24 contestants were divided into two tribes based on celebrity status: "Champions," composed of 12 people who have received accolades and fame for their exceptional work in their given fields, and "Contenders," composed of 12 non-celebrities. The Champions include Boost Juice founder and Shark Tank star Janine Allis, former senator, Olympic hockey gold medalist and Olympic sprinter Nova Peris, Olympic speed skating gold medalist Steven Bradbury and Australian Survivor season 4 contestant Luke Toki, who is the first former Australian Survivor player to return for another season. Among the Contenders is professional wrestler Matt Farrelly, former AFL player Shaun Hampson and The Amazing Race Australia 1 contestant Samantha "Sam" Schoers.

Notes

Future appearances 
David Genat, John Eastoe, Daisy Richardson, Abbey Holmes and Harry Hills competed on Australian Survivor: All Stars. Andy Meldrum competed on Australian Survivor: Blood V Water with his sister Kate. Shaun Hampson competed as a hero in Australian Survivor: Heroes V Villains

Outside of Survivor, David Genat competed on the fifth season of The Celebrity Apprentice Australia with Janine Allis appearing on the series as an advisor. In 2021, Steven Bradbury competed on Celebrity Holey Moley. Luke Toki competed on Big Brother VIP which he won. In 2022, Pia Miranda competed on the fourth season of The Masked Singer. Also in 2022, John Eastoe competed on The Challenge: Australia.

Season summary
The sequel to last season's theme, 24 contestants were divided into two tribes . 12 Contenders, representing everyday Australians, faced off against the 12 Champions, high achievers in their respective fields. Joining the Champions was Luke from Australian Survivor 2017 as the People's Champion. Despite having a returning player in their tribe, the Champions struggled in challenges with an initial Sporty Seven leading the tribe, until David, Janine, Luke, and Pia managed to get the alliance to turn on themselves. Meanwhile, the Contenders were a united front with Shaun, a former AFL player, and Daisy as a power duo, with Andy and Harry floating in the middle.

Down 11 to 7, the Champions' new alliance were split apart in a tribe swap that left allies David and Luke stranded in a Champions tribe with 7 original Contenders. However, with clever idol plays, and the Contenders working to break up Andy's social game with the women, the duo managed to survive even after a surprise kidnap vote which saw Shaun being stolen from the Contenders by the new Champions tribe. With the physical power shifting to the new Champions, Harry and Janine led opposing alliances which saw Harry's remaining allies picked off one by one while he saved himself with idols. Before the merge arrived, the two made a truce to blindside the last of the remaining Sporty Seven Champions in Simon, but an injury at the last tribal immunity challenge by Ross saw Tribal Council cancelled for the Contenders.

Ross's evacuation saw the Champions and Contenders on equal level entering the merge, but the Contenders lost their numbers when the merged tribe, Soli Bula, unanimously decided to take out Andy as an untrustworthy player, with Shaun following due to his status as a physical threat. The women in the Champions' alliance gathered the Contenders and Simon to blindside David and Luke, but a key immunity win by Luke saw the supermodel be sent to the jury instead of him. As the Contenders' numbers shrunk, Luke and Abbey started to stray from the Champions and aligned with the last two Contenders, Harry and Baden, to vote Simon to Exile Beach to defeat the last remaining Contender woman, Daisy. After Simon's return and subsequent permanent elimination, the new alliance turned on a perceived strategic powerhouse in Janine. With the bigger challenge threats eliminated, Luke began an immunity streak which also saw him finding an Send Back advantage, which allowed him to pick any player to send back to camp during Tribal before the vote. He used the advantage to send Baden back to camp in order to turn on Abbey over his closer ally, Pia. However, Luke's immunity run ended at the final four with the two Contenders and Pia sending him to the jury. With an Australian Survivor record-breaking final immunity challenge lasting over 6 hours and 40 minutes, Baden surprised the jury with an immunity win and sent the wily Harry to the jury instead of Pia.
 
The final two, Baden and Pia, were both criticized for their subtle social game by the jury. However, Pia managed to point out her contributions to the numerous decisions made by the Champions' alliance post swap and kidnapping until the merge, which saw louder power players systematically voted out. Baden struggled to assert his agency in his game, rather than the game being played past him. With a unanimous decision of 9 votes by the jury, Pia's social and strategic game was awarded at the end of the final Tribal Council in Fiji with the grand prize and the title of Sole Survivor.

In the case of multiple tribes or castaways who win reward or immunity, they are listed in order of finish, or alphabetically where it was a team effort; where one castaway won and invited others, the invitees are in brackets.
Notes

Episodes

Voting history
Tribal Phase (Days 1-28)

Individual phase (Day 29–50)

Notes

Reception

Ratings
Ratings data is from OzTAM and represents the viewership from the 5 largest Australian metropolitan centres (Sydney, Melbourne, Brisbane, Perth and Adelaide).
 
Notes

References

External links
 

2019 Australian television seasons
Australian Survivor seasons
2019 in Fiji
Television shows filmed in Fiji
Television shows set in Fiji